William Dunn (July 1877 – unknown) was an English footballer. His regular position was as a forward.  Born in Middlesbrough, he played for South Bank and Manchester United.

External links
MUFCInfo.com profile

1877 births
English footballers
South Bank F.C. players
Manchester United F.C. players
Year of death missing
Association football forwards